The Needle is a  sea stack on the island of Hoy, in Orkney, Scotland.

Climbing
There is only one known route, a 5C from the landward side.

References

Climbing areas of Scotland
Landforms of Orkney
Stacks of Scotland
Tourist attractions in Orkney
Hoy